Total Peace is a concept created by the government of Gustavo Petro to turn the search for peace into a state policy. This includes negotiating peace with illegal armed groups, but also putting the community at the center of these negotiations, since they are the ones in the middle of the confrontation.

The law passed in October allows Petro to initiate a peace process with all armed actors and put an end to a decades-long armed conflict that has left almost half a million dead and millions displaced.

The law grants powers to negotiate with armed groups such as the ELN, and the FARC dissidents that rejected a 2016 agreement and returned to the armed struggle and another that never signed the pact. It can also initiate peace negotiations with criminal gangs such as the Clan del Golfo, whose leaders and members may receive benefits such as reduced sentences and non-extradition in exchange for reporting routes to export cocaine and handing over part of the illegally obtained fortunes.

Total Peace also contemplates the creation of a peace fund to guarantee social investment in remote areas hit by violence and the presence of illegal armed groups.

Approval
The project was evaluated in advance by members of the two chambers, the Senate and the House of Representatives, where it was subsequently approved as Law 181 or the Total Peace Law, with 62 votes in favor and 13 against in the Senate and 128 votes in favor and seven against in the House of Representatives.

Communities welcomed all the efforts towards complete peace and pointed out that the initiative is strengthened with the comprehensive implementation of the Peace Agreement and that together with the project to bring criminal organizations to justice, they will be a substantial contribution to the materialization of complete peace.

According to the political group, the peace agenda promoted by the Colombian president cuts across all the objectives of his government program, considering that structural changes require the end of all armed conflicts in the country.

In this sense, Comunes called on all armed groups to dialogue or submit to justice to achieve that goal.

Support and opposition
The international community has welcomed Petro's intention to re-establish the peace agreements ignored by the previous administration; the United Nations will support the implementation with millions of resources provided by the Multidonor Fund.

Mireia Villar Forner, resident coordinator of the United Nations system in Colombia and co-president of the Fund, assured the press that, in an innovative way, the Fund intends to support broader actions to build peace in Colombia beyond the implementation of the peace agreement signed in 2016 between the State and the guerrilla of the Revolutionary Armed Forces of Colombia (FARC).

The Multidonor Fund received new contributions for 2023 that add up to 17.4 million dollars from Norway, Germany, Ireland and the United Kingdom and that complement others already made by countries such as Switzerland, Canada and Spain. Thus, the action plan approved for next year will have an investment of 55 million dollars, the highest since the fund was created in 2016 to support the peace process with the FARC. However, the amount that will be invested in the "total peace" policy of the current government was not detailed.

Conservative members of Congress argued that the new law would not protect the rights of the victims of the conflict, and the creation of peace managers to facilitate dialog was unconstitutional. They presented their arguments to Colombia's Constitutional Court in an attempt to have the law repealed.

References

Colombian peace process
Colombian conflict
FARC